KXPZ (99.5 FM, "Zia Country 99-5") is a commercial radio station licensed to Las Cruces, New Mexico owned and operated by Bravo Mic Communications. It also covers surrounding areas such as Truth or Consequences, Deming, Hatch and West Texas. Its studios are located in Las Cruces and its transmitter is located near Rincon.

History

KVLC/KROL "The Rock Of Love"
The station launched in 1989 under the KVLC-FM call letter. In mid 1993, the station changed formats to Christian Contemporary as KROL "The Rock Of Love", with most of its programming coming from the Salem Music Networks.

The Rocket 99.5
In February 2006, it was announced that Bravo Mic Communications was purchasing the station with the sale becoming final in May of that year. 
On May 15, 2006, the station dropped the Christian format and began stunting with an all-Barry Manilow format as "Barry 99". Then on June 15 the station launched its active rock format as "The Rocket 99.5" with the call letters KXPZ. For the first three years, the station was jockless until Lyndsey Green joined for afternoons. Later in the year, Jack Lutz, Shannon Ellis and Ricky T. joined the station as well.

Zia Country 99-5
On August 31, 2014, it was announced that KXPZ will drop its active rock format and move to online only at TheRocketOnline.com; at which time 99.5 would flip to country as "Zia Country 99-5". The name "Zia Country" is taken from the Native American tribe whose sun symbol is on the New Mexico state flag.

The station made the change on September 2, 2014 at midnight.

Current Nielsen radio ratings for the Las Cruces market: 2.6 (#5).

Airstaff
The current lineup (as of August 2016) is as follows

 Morning Show (5 a.m. – 10 a.m.): Real Country, Real Mornings— Lyndsey Kalson
 Mid-Days (10 a.m. – 3 p.m.): Ricky T
 Afternoon Drive (3 p.m. – 7 p.m.): Patricia
 Nighttime (7 p.m. – 12 a.m.): Sixx 
 PD/Music Director: Lyndsey Kalson

References

External links
 KXPZ official website
 

1989 establishments in New Mexico
Country radio stations in the United States
New Mexico State Aggies football
Radio stations established in 1989
XPZ